The Anaheim City Council is the legislative branch of government for the city of Anaheim, California.


Structure 
The city council is made up of the mayor, who is elected at-large, and six city council members who are elected by-district. Both the mayor and city council members serve four-year terms. All are limited to two consecutive terms, and a person who serves one term as a councilmember followed immediately by one term as mayor is considered to have served two consecutive terms under the term limits provision of the Anaheim city charter.

Anaheim has a council–manager government, in which the council appoints a city manager to oversee the administrative operations of the city, implement the council's policies, and advise the council.

The most recent general election was held in November 2022 for  Mayor and council districts 2, 3, and 6. The next elections for these seats will be held in 2026 General elections for council districts 1, 4, and 5 were last held in November 2018. The next election for these seats will be in 2024.  The mayor and city council seats are all officially non-partisan by state law, although most members have a party preference.

Current members 

The mayor is presiding officer of the city council and elected at-large.  The other members of the city council are elected from single-member districts and currently includes Councilmembers Jose Diaz, Carlos A. Leon, Natalie Rubalcava, Norma Campos Kurtz, Stephen Faessel, and Natalie Meeks. The City of Anaheim has a detailed map of council districts on its website.

See also 

List of mayors of Anaheim, California

Notes

References

External links 

 Anaheim City Council Official Website

Anaheim
Government of Anaheim, California